The 2016 Duke Blue Devils football team represented Duke University in the 2016 NCAA Division I FBS football season as a member of the Atlantic Coast Conference (ACC) in the Coastal Division. The team was led by head coach David Cutcliffe, in his ninth year, and played its home games at Wallace Wade Stadium in Durham, North Carolina. They finished the season 4–8 overall and 1–7 in ACC play to tie for sixth place in the Coastal Division.

Schedule

Personnel

Roster

Coaching staff

Game summaries

North Carolina Central

Wake Forest

at Northwestern

at Notre Dame

Virginia

Army

at Louisville

at Georgia Tech

Virginia Tech

North Carolina

at Pittsburgh

at Miami (FL)

Team players in the NFL
No Duke players were selected in the 2017 NFL Draft.

References

Duke
Duke Blue Devils football seasons
Duke Blue Devils football